This is a list of insulation materials used around the world. 

Typical R-values are given for various materials and structures as approximations based on the average of available figures and are sorted by lowest value. R-value at 1 m gives R-values normalised to a  thickness and sorts by median value of the range.

References

Building insulation materials